F150 or variation, may refer to:

 Ford F-150 pickup truck
 Ferrari 150º Italia (aka Ferrari F150) 2011 Formula 1 racecar
 LaFerrari (model F150) 2013-2018 sports car
 "F-150", a 2020 song by Robyn Ottolini
 Reims F150, license production variation of the Cessna 150 light airplane
 Farman F.150, twin-engined biplane bomber warplane
 , lead ship of the Royal Australian Navy Anzac-class frigate warship
 , South African Navy frigate warship

See also